Anna Malmhake (born 1966) is a Swedish business executive specialised in FMCG. She is currently serving as the chairperson and CEO of The Absolut Company. She is a graduate of Stockholm University, and holds a Bachelor degree of Social Science, Business and Law.

Career
Malmhake started her career at Procter & Gamble in 1991, after graduating from Stockholm University with a Bachelor degree of Social Science, Business and Law. In 2007, she joined Vin & Sprit AB as global brand director for Absolut Vodka. Soon after Pernod Ricard bought Vin & Sprit AB, Malmhake was promoted to vice president Global Marketing, a position she held until 2011.

Between 2011 and 2016, Malmhake served as Chairman and CEO of Irish Distillers, before returning to The Absolut Company as CEO on July 1, 2016

Boards and honors
Apart from being the chairwoman of The Absolut Company, Malmhake is also on the board of Oriflame. In 2015, she won the CEO Businesswoman of the Year Award  from Image. In 2016 and 2017, Veckans Affärer listed Malmhake as one of Sweden’s most powerful women of the media- and communications industry.

Personal life
Malmhake lives in Stockholm, Sweden. She has two sons.

References 

Swedish chief executives
Stockholm University alumni
1966 births
Living people
Women chief executives
Swedish women business executives
Procter & Gamble people